The Trouble with Wives is a 1925 American silent comedy film directed by Malcolm St. Clair, written by Sada Cowan and Howard Higgin, and starring Florence Vidor, Tom Moore, Esther Ralston, Ford Sterling, Lucy Beaumont, and Edgar Kennedy. It was released on September 28, 1925, by Paramount Pictures.

Plot
As described in a film magazine reviews, Grace Hyatt suspects her businessman husband William of being infatuated with his shoe designer from Paris. Several situations develop which make it appear that William is interested in the young woman. Al Hennessey tells Grace that he and William have visited the woman's apartment. William becomes so uncomfortable with the situation at home that he leaves for a summer hotel. Grace determines that she will get a divorce. When she visits the hotel, she finds the other woman there is the bride of Al Hennessey. The Hyatts are reconciled.

Cast

Preservation
With no prints of The Trouble with Wives located in any film archives, it is a lost film.

References

External links

Still at silentfilmstillarchive.com

1925 films
1920s English-language films
Silent American comedy films
1926 comedy films
1926 films
Paramount Pictures films
Films directed by Malcolm St. Clair
American black-and-white films
Lost American films
American silent feature films
1925 comedy films
1920s lost films
1920s American films